Scoresby Bay is an Arctic waterway in Qikiqtaaluk Region, Nunavut, Canada. It is located in Nares Strait by eastern Ellesmere Island's Darling Peninsula, west of Nunatami, Greenland.

The bay is named in honor of William Scoresby, an English Arctic explorer and scientist.

Geography
The area is characterized as a flood plain of gravel and silt.

References

Bays of Qikiqtaaluk Region
Ellesmere Island